Pınarbaşı is a town and district of Kayseri Province in the Central Anatolia region of Turkey. The population is mostly made up of Circassians who settled this area by the Ottomans after their migration to Turkey as a result of Circassian genocide.

History 
Ariarateia (Greek: Ἀριαράθεια; Roman.: Ariarátheia) or Ariarátia (present-day Pınarbaşı, in Kayseri, Turkey) was a Cappadocian city founded by Ariarate IV (r. 220–163 BC), in the region at the time known as Sargarausena. It was incorporated into the Roman Empire upon the annexation of Cappadocia as a province by Emperor Tiberius.

In the 4th century, more precisely during the reign of Constantine (r. 306–337), the eastern portion of Cappadocia was separated to form Lesser Armenia. In the middle of the same century, Armenia Minor was divided into Armenia Prima and Armenia Secunda, Ariarateia being incorporated into the latter. In 431, Ariarateia is documented as a suffragan diocese. During the Byzantine Empire, it was renamed Dasmenda.

References

 Kayseri Governorship Melikgazi page
 Melikgazi Municipality 

Populated places in Kayseri Province
Districts of Kayseri Province
Towns in Turkey